Nathan Mardis Rolison (born March 27, 1977) is an American former professional baseball first baseman. He batted left and threw right-handed. Rolison had one hit in 13 at-bats, in eight games, in his one-year career. He was drafted by the Marlins in the 2nd round of the 1995 MLB draft.

External links

1977 births
Living people
American expatriate baseball players in Canada
Baseball players from Mississippi
Brevard County Manatees players
Calgary Cannons players
Columbus Clippers players
Florida Marlins players
Gulf Coast Marlins players
Kane County Cougars players
Major League Baseball first basemen
People from Petal, Mississippi
Portland Sea Dogs players
Tacoma Rainiers players
Sportspeople from Hattiesburg, Mississippi